This is a list of properties and historic districts listed on the National Register of Historic Places in Norfolk County, Massachusetts, other than those within the city of Quincy and the towns of Brookline and Milton. Norfolk County contains more than 300 listings, of which the more than 100 not in the above three communities are listed below.  Some listings extend across municipal boundaries, and appear on more than one list.

The locations of National Register properties and districts (at least for all showing latitude and longitude coordinates below) may be seen in a map by clicking on "Map of all coordinates".

Cities and towns listed separately
Due to the number of listings in the county, some cities and towns have their sites listed separately.

Current listings

|}

Former listings

|}

References

Norfolk